Monkey Island is a series of adventure games. The first four games in the series were produced and published by LucasArts, earlier known as Lucasfilm Games. The fifth installment of the franchise was developed by Telltale Games in collaboration with LucasArts. A sixth game was developed by Terrible Toybox in cooperation with Lucasfilm Games and Devolver Digital.

The games follow the misadventures of the hapless Guybrush Threepwood as he struggles to become the most notorious pirate in the Caribbean, defeat the plans of the evil undead pirate LeChuck and win the heart of Governor Elaine Marley. Each game's plot usually involves the mysterious Monkey Island and its impenetrable secrets.

The first game in the series was created by Ron Gilbert, Tim Schafer and Dave Grossman. Gilbert worked on the first two games before leaving LucasArts. Grossman and Schafer, who also worked on the first two games, enjoyed success on other games before they both left LucasArts. The rights to Monkey Island remained with LucasArts, and the third and fourth games were created without direct involvement from the original writing staff. Dave Grossman was the project leader of the fifth game in the series and Gilbert was involved with the first design of the game. Gilbert's studio developed the sixth game, Return to Monkey Island, with Grossman assisting.

Overview
The Monkey Island series is known for its humour and "player-friendly" qualities. The player cannot permanently place the game in an unwinnable state or cause Guybrush to die without great effort. This "player-friendly" approach was unusual at the time of the first game's release in 1990; prominent adventure-game rivals included Sierra On-Line and Infocom, both of which were known for games with sudden and frequent character deaths or "lock-outs". LucasArts itself used such closed plot paths for its drama games like Indiana Jones and the Last Crusade: The Graphic Adventure (1989), but preferred the open format for other humour-oriented adventure games such as Sam & Max Hit the Road (1993) and Day of the Tentacle (1993). After Monkey Island 2: LeChuck's Revenge in 1991, the series went in hiatus until 1997, when it resumed with The Curse of Monkey Island. After the fourth entry, Escape from Monkey Island, the franchise again went on hiatus, though numerous rumors persisted about a revival until the announcement of Tales of Monkey Island by Telltale Games in early 2009. A new entry, Return to Monkey Island, was released in September 2022.

Much of the music of the games is composed by Michael Land. The score largely consists of reggae, Caribbean and dub-inspired music.

The series also tends to break the fourth wall, as several of the characters acknowledge that they are in a video game.

Setting
Each of the games takes place on fictional islands in the Caribbean around the Golden Age of Piracy sometime between the 17th and 18th centuries, though in the fashion of a theme park: The islands teem with pirates dressed in outfits that seem to come from films and comic books rather than history, and there are many deliberate anachronisms and references to modern-day popular culture. The theme park motif is particularly strong near the end of the second game, which seems to take place in the service section of a modern-day theme park, concrete tunnels complete with elevators and electric lighting. The third game begins with Guybrush adrift in a bumper car instead of a boat, and ends on a roller coaster ride on Monkey Island. Oblique references from dialogue within the games suggest this theme park motif may have been a misperception stemming from a voodoo curse, but ultimately leaves it unresolved.

The main setting of the Monkey Island games is the "Tri-Island Area", a fictional archipelago in the Caribbean. Since the first game in the series, The Secret of Monkey Island, three of the games have visited the eponymous island of Monkey Island, while all have introduced their own set of islands to explore. Monkey Island 2: LeChuck's Revenge features four new islands, but does not return to Monkey Island until the final cutscene. The Curse of Monkey Island introduces three, and Escape from Monkey Island, which revisits some of the older islands, features three new islands as well. As such, the "Tri-Island area" actually comprises a total of 13 visitable islands. Tales of Monkey Island takes place in a new area of the Caribbean called the "Gulf of Melange".

The main islands of the Tri-Island Area are Mêlée Island, Booty Island, and Plunder Island governed by Elaine Marley in place of her long lost grandfather, Horatio Torquemada Marley. Elaine moves from island to island at her convenience, though she considers her governor's mansion on Mêlée Island, the capital island of the area, as home.

Other islands in the region are considered under the umbrella of Tri-Island Area as well, even though not directly governed by Elaine include: Lucre Island, Jambalaya Island, Scabb Island, Phatt Island, Hook Island, Skull Island, Knuttin Atoll, Blood Island, Spittle Island and Pinchpenny Island.

The Gulf of Melange has its own set of islands: Flotsam Island, the Jerkbait Islands (Spinner Cay, Spoon Island, Roe Island), Brillig Island, Boulder Beach, Isle of Ewe, and the Rock of Gelato.

Monkey Island and Dinky Island are not officially part of any island area, but nonetheless are central to the series' overall back-story and canon.

Characters
The games have a wide cast of characters, many of which reappear throughout the series. Each entry in the series revolves around three main characters: the hero Guybrush Threepwood; his love interest Elaine Marley; and the villain, the Demon/Zombie/Ghost pirate LeChuck. Several other characters such as the Voodoo Lady, Stan the salesman, Murray the Demonic Talking Skull and Herman Toothrot make multiple appearances within the series as well.

Inspiration
Ron Gilbert's two main inspirations for the story were Disneyland's Pirates of the Caribbean ride and Tim Powers' book On Stranger Tides. The book was the inspiration for the story and characters, while the ride was the inspiration for the ambiance. Gilbert said in interview that "[the POTC Ride] keeps you moving through the adventure but I've always wished I could get off and wander around, learn more about the characters, and find a way onto those pirate ships. So with The Secret of Monkey Island I wanted to create a game that had the same flavor, but where you could step off the boat and enter that whole storybook world".

Several specific references to the ride are made throughout the series, including a puzzle in the second game based on the ride's famous Jail Cell/Dog With Keys scene (the dog in the scene is even named Walt). The banjo music in the opening menu of the third game is also very reminiscent of the banjo music at the beginning of the ride. Additional references are made to Disneyland and theme parks in general throughout the series, including Guybrush finding an E ticket.

Media

Games

The Secret of Monkey Island

The series debuted in 1990 with The Secret of Monkey Island on the Amiga, MS-DOS, Atari ST and Macintosh platforms; the game was later ported to FM Towns and Mega-CD (1993). A remake version with updated graphics and new voiceovers was released for PlayStation Network, PC Windows, Xbox Live Arcade and OS X. An iPhone version was also released on July 23, 2009.

The game starts off with the main character Guybrush Threepwood stating "I want to be a pirate!" To do so, he must prove himself to three old pirate captains. During the perilous pirate trials, he meets the beautiful governor Elaine Marley, with whom he falls in love, unaware that the ghost pirate LeChuck also has his eyes on her. When Elaine is kidnapped, Guybrush procures crew and ship to track LeChuck down, defeat him and rescue his love.

Monkey Island 2: LeChuck's Revenge

The second game, Monkey Island 2: LeChuck's Revenge from 1991, was available for fewer platforms; it was only released for PC MS-DOS, Amiga, Macintosh, and later for FM Towns. A Special Edition version, in a similar style as The Secret of Monkey Island: Special Edition, was released in July 2010 for iPhone, iPad, iPod Touch, Mac, PC, PS3 and Xbox 360.

As Guybrush, with a treasure chest in hand, and Elaine hang onto ropes in a void, he tells her the story of the game. He has decided to find the greatest of all treasures, that of Big Whoop. Unwittingly he helps revive LeChuck, who is now in zombie form. Guybrush is eventually captured by his nemesis, but escapes with help from Wally and finds the treasure only to find himself dangling from a rope, as depicted at the beginning of the game. As Guybrush concludes his story, his rope breaks and he finds himself facing LeChuck, whom he finally defeats using voodoo. The surrealistic ending is open to a number of interpretations. In the manual of The Curse of Monkey Island, it is stated that Guybrush falls victim to a hex implemented by LeChuck.

The Curse of Monkey Island

The Curse of Monkey Island, the third in the series, was exclusively available for PC Windows in 1997 after a 6-year hiatus. The Curse of Monkey Island was released after what could be said to be the biggest technological change in the gaming industry. This new era saw the advent of digital audio, CD-ROM technology, and advancements in graphics.

Monkey Island I and II were originally released on floppy discs with text dialog only.
The visuals of the third installment was also an advance over the old game, using a cel animation style. The Curse of Monkey Island is the only game in the series to feature this style of animation; subsequent games used 3D polygon animation.

Guybrush unwittingly turns Elaine into a gold statue with a cursed ring, and she is soon stolen by pirates. He tracks her down before searching for a ring that can lift the curse. LeChuck appears in a fiery demon form, and is on the heels of Guybrush until a stand-off in LeChuck's amusement park ride, Monkey Mountain.

Escape from Monkey Island

Escape from Monkey Island, the fourth installment, was released in 2000 for PC Windows, and in 2001 for Macintosh and PlayStation 2.

When Guybrush Threepwood and Elaine Marley return from their honeymoon, they find that Elaine has been declared officially dead, her mansion is under a destruction order, and her position as governor is up for election. Guybrush investigates and unearths a conspiracy by LeChuck and evil real estate developer Ozzie Mandrill to use a voodoo talisman, "The Ultimate Insult", to make all pirates docile in order to turn the Caribbean into a center of tourism.

Tales of Monkey Island

Tales of Monkey Island is the fifth installment within the series, co-developed by Telltale Games and LucasArts, with a simultaneous release both on WiiWare and PC. Unlike other installments, Tales is an episodic adventure consisting of five different episodes. The first episode was released on July 7, with the last one released on December 8, 2009.

During a heated battle with his nemesis, the evil pirate LeChuck, Guybrush unwittingly unleashes an insidious pox that rapidly spreads across the Caribbean, turning pirates into zombie-like monsters. The Voodoo Lady sends Guybrush in search of a legendary sea sponge to stem the epidemic, but this seemingly straightforward quest has surprises around every corner.
Tales of Monkey Island was also released on PlayStation Network as a bundle for US$20.00.

In November 2011, when CEO of Telltale games Dan Conners was asked a question about another season of Monkey Island, he replied: "I wish we had the rights to do more Monkey but we don't. Right now what I gather is LA is focused on building AAA titles internally but honestly we don't talk much these days".

There had also been some speculation on Telltale Games forums about a possible sequel to Tales of Monkey Island, although this was dismissed by Gilbert, who stated: "Basically, when we were working on Tales, I understood that ... I'm too old for that job now" in an interview with Edge in March 2010. The Tales team claims that, despite a considerably increasing fanbase since 2009–10, there were not any plans to continue the series within the next five-year interval. In 2018 Telltale Games closed down.

Return to Monkey Island

With the purchase of LucasArts by the Walt Disney Company in 2012, the rights to the franchise are now property of Disney. In the second half of 2010s, Disney Interactive ceased the production on gaming and transitioned to a licensing model. Gilbert wrote on Twitter that he was interested in buying the Monkey Island and Maniac Mansion properties. Fans of the series launched an online petition asking Disney to sell the franchise to Gilbert; by December 2021, the petition had gathered about 29,000 signatures.

Return to Monkey Island, the sixth Monkey Island installment, was released on September 19, 2022 on the Nintendo Switch and Windows, coming to other formats later. It is a collaboration between Gilbert's Terrible Toybox studio and Lucasfilm Games, and published by Devolver Digital. A frame story in the game serves to explain and continue from the ending of LeChuck's Revenge, while the main narrative takes place after the other games in the series. Ron Gilbert has expressed his desire to tell a simple and focused pirate story in the game, whilst also redefining the adventure game user interface and incorporating an increased emphasis of meat pies into the greater lore. In addition to Gilbert, Grossman returns as co-writer, with music from veteran series composers Michael Land, Peter McConnell, and Clint Bajakian, and Dominic Armato, Alexandra Boyd, and Denny Delk reprising their roles as Guybrush, Elaine, and Murray. Jess Harnell replaces the retired Earl Boen as the voice of LeChuck.

Other appearances
In Indiana Jones and the Infernal Machine, Guybrush can be accessed as a playable character via a cheat code; in addition, a Monkey Island-themed secret room can be found in the game's final level. Guybrush also appears in Star Wars: The Force Unleashed II as a playable skin for Starkiller named "Guybrush Threepkiller".

Guybrush is paid homage in the Naughty Dog video game Uncharted 4: A Thief's End, where a pirate with major similarities to Guybrush is featured as one of the twelve pirate captains that founded Libertalia. Although he remains unnamed throughout the game, the resemblance is uncanny and his sigil is represented by a monkey. His portrait can be seen in the Libertalia treasury with the other founders and though his name is partly scratched out, the letters still visible spell out the truncated name "Guy Wood".

Several elements from the Monkey Island series appear in Sea of Thieves as part of its June 2021 "A Pirate's Life" update. Developed in collaboration with Disney and primarily themed after Pirates of the Caribbean, multiple references to the characters and locales from the Monkey Island franchise can be found in journals by Kate Capsize scattered around the wreckage of The Headless Monkey during the update's first Tall Tale, accompanied by an original arrangement of the Monkey Island theme. According to the journals, Guybrush and Elaine Threepwood are celebrating their honeymoon somewhere upon the Sea of Thieves.

In an update to Hitman 3, a new pirate-themed map was added, which featured an Easter Egg referencing Monkey Island in the form of a gravestone in the environment reading "G Threepwood, Mighty Pirate", a clear reference to Guybrush.

Stan's used coffins is also referred to in one of the levels of the game "Outlaws", also by Lucasarts.

Cancelled film
Shortly after Pixar, a spinout from Lucasfilm, found success with the first Toy Story film in 1995, there had been a push across Hollywood for more digitally animated films. Lucasfilm's Industrial Light & Magic (ILM), in the midst of transitioning from practical to digital effects, offered its services for producing these films to other studios. One of the first projects they tried to work on was with Universal Pictures to revive the Universal Classic Monsters line with a film called Frankenstein and the Wolfman. While several scripts and preliminary art was produced for this film, shake-ups at Universal due to the financial failure of Babe: Pig in the City led to changes in leadership for the film and ultimately its cancellation.

David Carson, who had been set to direct Frankenstein and the Wolfman but left after the Universal shake-up, came back to ILM with the idea of an animated film based on the first Monkey Island game around 2000. With initial support from ILM, Carson worked an initial script with Corey Rosen and Scott Leberecht as to pitch the idea to Amblin Entertainment, the production company owned by Steven Spielberg. Spielberg had told Carson that he had previously told George Lucas that he should have made a Monkey Island movie years before, and other meetings with Amblin went well to proceed to further screenwriting work. The rest of ILM's story department was brought in to help write, including Steve Purcell, but this team worked separately from the writers that were developing the actual games, creating a disconnect between story the film was going with and the narrative already established in the video game series. As they continued to work out the screenplay, the direction of the film continued to veer further from the video game series, including at one point where Spielberg had suggested the game be about the monkeys on Monkey Island instead of the pirates. According to Carson, the lack of a creative direction at this point led to the film being shelved at ILM.

Details about the film were first revealed publicly in 2011 as part of the Monkey Island Special Edition Collection which included some of the film's concept art, storyboards, and scripts.

It had been rumored that Ted Elliott and Terry Rossio had been involved in the writing of the Monkey Island script which they subsequently used as the basis for the first Pirates of the Caribbean film. Both Elliott and Rossio had been to ILM and were shown parts of the Monkey Island script, around the same time they were working on their script for Pirates. When Pirates was released, many fans of the Monkey Island series made comparisons of parts of the film to the games, and when news of the cancelled film first arose in 2011, the potential connection of Elliott and Rossio to the Monkey Island script started. Both Carson and Rossio stated that many of the tropes in both Monkey Island and Pirates are based on the classic pirate movies and that there was no direct reuse of the cancelled Monkey Island film in Pirates.

Common themes

The games in the series share several minigames, puzzles, in-jokes, and references.

Maps
Each game contains a map puzzle, wherein Guybrush must use an unconventional map to find his way through a maze. The first game features a set of dance instructions that point the way through the dense forest of Mêlée Island to find the Island's fabled treasure. In the second game, Guybrush must use a song from a dream sequence to find his way through LeChuck's dungeon. The third game is the reverse of this, as the instructions the player receives are traditional directions and need to be used on a theatre light board. The fourth game has a set of directions based on time, and the fifth based on animal sounds and the direction of the wind and finally a map to get one of the items needed for "The Feast of the Senses". The sixth features a map of the Mêlée Island forest that is based on cardinal direction in Casual Mode, and based on the plant life seen at each exit in Hard Mode.

Recipes
Each game features a sequence of some sort, where players must gather the ingredients to create an item. Then, later in the game, the player has to create the item again, but this time around with improvised materials. In 'Secret', Guybrush must brew a voodoo concoction but, lacking ingredients, must improvise with the contents of his inventory, leading to amusing puns. In Monkey Island 2, at two points of the game, Guybrush has to create a voodoo doll, one of Largo LaGrande with legitimate ingredients, and one of LeChuck with improvised ingredients. The same goes with the hangover medicine in 'Curse' and the Ultimate Insult in 'Escape'. 'Tales' starts with Guybrush having to obtain fizzy root-beer then dropping it and him having to instead put together some fizzy root-grog. Later 'Tales' requires Guybrush to put together a 'feast of the senses' to increase the size of La Esponja Grande, and later track down a reversed recipe for the 'diet of the senses'.

Minigames
Each game also contains a minigame based on learning and repetition of a sequence in order to become more proficient: Insult Sword fighting in the first and third games, a number-based "password" as well as a spitting contest in the second, banjo fighting in the third, insult arm wrestling and Monkey Kombat in the fourth, and Pirate Face-Off in the fifth. The first, second and fourth games also feature a puzzle which involves following another character through several locations, a trick also used in Indiana Jones and the Fate of Atlantis. Some other minigames include naval cannon battles, and platform diving.

Pop culture references

The Monkey Island series is full of spoofs, in-jokes, humorous references, and Easter eggs: so many, in fact, that entire web sites are dedicated to their detection and listing.

Running gags include lines such as "Look behind you, a three-headed monkey!", the introduction "My name is Guybrush Threepwood and I'm a mighty pirate", "How appropriate, you fight like a cow", "I'm selling these fine leather jackets" (a reference to Indiana Jones and the Last Crusade: The Graphic Adventure), and "That's the second biggest [object] I've ever seen", a catchphrase from the TV series Get Smart (and in EMI "That's the second largest... No, that IS the largest conch shell I've ever seen!"), and the astounding fact that Guybrush can hold his breath for ten minutes.

The Secret of Monkey Island poked fun at rival company Sierra's game-over screens. For example, when Guybrush falls off a cliff, a "game over" window appears, but then Guybrush bounces back to the top of the cliff, explaining that he landed in a "rubber tree". Also, when Guybrush stays underwater for more than ten minutes, he dies and a "game over" dialog box identical to that of Sierra's King's Quest series appears, giving the player an option to restore a saved game and jokingly stating: "Hope you saved the game!"

The "stump joke" made fun about the use of multiple floppy disks for one program, but was not initially recognized by gamers as a joke. In The Secret of Monkey Island, Guybrush comes across a passageway hidden beneath a stump, at which point a screen says to insert Disk No. 114. Later, in The Curse of Monkey Island, Guybrush looks through a crack in the ceiling of an underground crypt to find himself peeking out of the same stump. The stump joke is also referenced in other games developed by Monkey Island team members, such as Grim Fandango and Psychonauts.

Ron Gilbert has openly admitted that sections of Monkey Island 2 borrowed extensively from the original Pirates of the Caribbean Disneyland ride, such as the famous "dog holding the keys to the jail-cell". He has also said that he thought the second film (Pirates of the Caribbean: Dead Man's Chest) may have 'borrowed' from the Monkey Island series. The opening menu banjo music in Curse is also very reminiscent of the beginning of the Disneyland ride.

Each game in the series features cameo appearances by Steve Purcell's characters Sam & Max, who were featured in their own LucasArts adventure game, Sam & Max Hit the Road. These are replaced by the purple tentacle from yet another LucasArts adventure game Day of the Tentacle in the special edition versions.

There are many comic references to various Lucas projects, especially Star Wars. For instance, in Monkey Island 2 the Voodoo lady exclaims, "I just felt a sudden disturbance in the Force, as if a tiny, tiny voice just called out in fear", as an homage to Obi-Wan's speech in Star Wars: A New Hope. In Curse, when the player clicks on the fort that has been damaged by cannon fire from LeChuck's ship, Guybrush replies "That's funny, the damage doesn't look as bad from out here", which is a line spoken by the droid C-3PO in the same Star Wars film. When trying to gain access to the Brimstone Beach Club on Plunder Island, Guybrush attempts to use a "Jedi mind trick" on the Cabaña Boy at the entrance. In Part V of Curse, LeChuck says to Guybrush during the opening dialogue "Search yer feelings, you know it to be true!", to which Guybrush replies "Oh no! It can't be!", lines that mirrored the dialogue between Darth Vader and Luke Skywalker in Star Wars V: The Empire Strikes Back. This scene is also reenacted at the end of Monkey Island 2 almost verbatim.

In LeChuck's Revenge, the Governor of Phatt Island, Governor Phatt, says in his sleep "Be careful with those snacks, Eugene" in reference to the Pink Floyd song "Careful With That Axe, Eugene".

The Secret of Monkey Island
None of the first five games explicitly reveal the "Secret of Monkey Island". LeChuck himself, when asked in the second and third games, refuses to answer the question; Guybrush can eventually prod LeChuck to confess that he does not know what the secret is. The team behind Escape from Monkey Island attempted to resolve the issue by showing that the Giant Monkey Head was actually the control room of a Giant Monkey Robot. The cut-scene in which the revelation was made is called "The Real Secret of Monkey Island".

Gilbert stated that he never told anyone what the true secret of Monkey Island is. Gilbert stated in a 2004 interview that when the game was originally conceived it was considered "too big", so they split it into three parts. He added that he "knows what the third [part] is" and "how the story's supposed to end", indicating that he had a definite concept of the secret and a conclusive third game.

The true nature of the secret acts as the focus of Return to Monkey Island, with several characters competing with one another to find "the Secret" and debating as to its nature. The game's conclusion reveals the secret to be a novelty T-shirt earned as a prize at a pirate-themed amusement park, which has acted as the setting for all of Guybrush's previous adventures. Guybrush, as the game's narrator, is intentionally ambiguous as to whether this is the actual secret, suggesting that the secret is different things to different people, and putting forth the notion that the story of the journey and the joy of speculating about the secret with others is more valuable than the reward itself.

After the release of "Return to Monkey Island," Ron Gilbert stated in a successive interview that the true secret, as conceived during development of the first installment of the series, was that Guybrush was in fact in a pirate-themed amusement park.

See also
 LucasArts adventure games
 SCUMM
 ScummVM

References

 
LucasArts franchises
Video games about skeletons
Video game franchises
Video games about pirates
Video game franchises introduced in 1990
Video games set on fictional islands
Video games set in the Caribbean
Video games set in the 17th century
Video games set in the 18th century